

Events

Pre-1600
 421 – Constantius III becomes co-Emperor of the Western Roman Empire.
1238 – The Mongols burn the Russian city of Vladimir.
1250 – Seventh Crusade: Crusaders engage Ayyubid forces in the Battle of Al Mansurah.
1347 – The Byzantine civil war of 1341–47 ends with a power-sharing agreement between John VI Kantakouzenos and John V Palaiologos.
1575 – Leiden University is founded, and given the motto Praesidium Libertatis.
1587 – Mary, Queen of Scots, is executed on suspicion of having been involved in the Babington Plot to murder her cousin, Queen Elizabeth I.
1590 – Luis de Carvajal y de la Cueva is tortured by the Inquisition in Mexico, charged with concealing the practice of Judaism of his sister and her children.

1601–1900
1601 – Robert Devereux, 2nd Earl of Essex, rebels against Queen Elizabeth I and the revolt is quickly crushed.
1693 – The College of William & Mary in Williamsburg, Virginia, America, is granted a charter by King William III and Queen Mary II.
1807 – After two days of bitter fighting, the Russians under Bennigsen and the Prussians under L'Estocq concede the Battle of Eylau to Napoleon.
1817 – Las Heras completes his crossing of the Andes with an army to join San Martín and liberate Chile from Spain.
1837 – Richard Johnson becomes the first Vice President of the United States chosen by the United States Senate.
1865 – Delaware refuses to ratify the Thirteenth Amendment to the U.S. Constitution. Slavery was outlawed in the United States, including Delaware, when the Amendment was ratified by the requisite number of states on December 6, 1865. Delaware ratified the Thirteenth Amendment on February 12, 1901, which was the ninety-second anniversary of the birth of Abraham Lincoln.
1879 – Sandford Fleming first proposes adoption of Universal Standard Time at a meeting of the Royal Canadian Institute.
  1879   – The England cricket team led by Lord Harris is attacked in a riot during a match in Sydney.
1885 – The first government-approved Japanese immigrants arrive in Hawaii.
1887 – The Dawes Act authorizes the President of the United States to survey Native American tribal land and divide it into individual allotments.

1901–present
1904 – Battle of Port Arthur: A surprise torpedo attack by the Japanese at Port Arthur, Japan starts the Russo-Japanese War.
  1904   – Aceh War: Dutch Colonial Army's Marechaussee regiment led by General G.C.E. van Daalen launch military campaign to capture Gayo Highland, Alas Highland, and Batak Highland in Dutch East Indies' Northern Sumatra region, which ends with genocide to Acehnese and Bataks people.
1910 – The Boy Scouts of America is incorporated by William D. Boyce.
1915 – D. W. Griffith's controversial film The Birth of a Nation premieres in Los Angeles.
1922 – United States President Warren G. Harding introduces the first radio set in the White House.
1924 – Capital punishment: The first state execution in the United States by gas chamber takes place in Nevada.
1937 – Spanish Civil War: Republicans establish the Interprovincial Council of Santander, Palencia and Burgos in Cantabria.
1942 – World War II: Japan invades Singapore.
  1942   – World War II: Dutch Colonial Army General Destruction Unit (AVC, Algemene Vernielings Corps) burns Banjarmasin, South Borneo to avoid Japanese capture.
1945 – World War II: The United Kingdom and Canada commence Operation Veritable to occupy the west bank of the Rhine.
  1945   – World War II: Mikhail Devyataev escapes with nine other Soviet inmates from a Nazi concentration camp in Peenemünde on the island of Usedom by hijacking the camp commandant's Heinkel He 111.
1946 – The first portion of the Revised Standard Version of the Bible, the first serious challenge to the popularity of the Authorized King James Version, is published.
  1946   – The People's Republic of Korea is dissolved in the North, establishing the communist-controlled Provisional People's Committee of North Korea.
1950 – Cold War: The Stasi, the secret police of East Germany, is established.
1955 – The Government of Sindh, Pakistan, abolishes the Jagirdari system in the province. One million acres (4,000 km2) of land thus acquired is to be distributed among the landless peasants.
1960 – Queen Elizabeth II of the United Kingdom issues an Order-in-Council, stating that she and her family would be known as the House of Windsor, and that her descendants will take the name Mountbatten-Windsor.
  1960   – The Hollywood Walk of Fame is established.
1962 – Charonne massacre: Nine trade unionists are killed by French police at the instigation of Nazi collaborator Maurice Papon, then chief of the Paris Prefecture of Police.
  1963   – The regime of Prime Minister of Iraq, Brigadier General Abd al-Karim Qasim is overthrown by the Ba'ath Party.
1965 – Eastern Air Lines Flight 663 crashes into the Atlantic Ocean and explodes, killing everyone aboard.
1968 – American civil rights movement: The Orangeburg massacre: An attack on black students from South Carolina State University who are protesting racial segregation at the town's only bowling alley, leaves three or four dead in Orangeburg, South Carolina.
1971 – The NASDAQ stock market index opens for the first time.
  1971   – South Vietnamese ground troops launch an incursion into Laos to try to cut off the Ho Chi Minh trail and stop communist infiltration.
1974 – After 84 days in space, the crew of Skylab 4, the last crew to visit American space station Skylab, returns to Earth.
1978 – Proceedings of the United States Senate are broadcast on radio for the first time.
1981 – Twenty-one association football spectators are trampled to death at Karaiskakis Stadium in Neo Faliro, Greece, after a football match between Olympiacos F.C. and AEK Athens F.C.
1983 – The Melbourne dust storm hits Australia's second largest city.
  1983   – Irish race horse Shergar is stolen by gunmen.
1986 – Hinton train collision: Twenty-three people are killed when a VIA Rail passenger train collides with a 118-car Canadian National freight train near the town of Hinton, Alberta, west of Edmonton. It is the worst rail accident in Canada until the Lac-Mégantic, Quebec derailment in 2013 which killed forty-seven people.
1989 – Independent Air Flight 1851 strikes Pico Alto mountain while on approach to Santa Maria Airport (Azores) killing all 144 passengers on board.
1993 – General Motors sues NBC after Dateline NBC allegedly rigs two crashes intended to demonstrate that some GM pickups can easily catch fire if hit in certain places. NBC settles the lawsuit the next day.
  1993   – An Iran Air Tours Tupolev Tu-154 and an Iranian Air Force Sukhoi Su-24 collide in mid-air near Qods, Iran, killing all 133 people on board both aircraft.
1996 – The U.S. Congress passes the Communications Decency Act.
2005 – Sri Lankan Civil War: Sri Lankan Tamil politician and former MP A. Chandranehru dies of injuries sustained in an ambush the previous day.
2013 – A blizzard disrupts transportation and leaves hundreds of thousands of people without electricity in the Northeastern United States and parts of Canada.
2014 – A hotel fire in Medina, Saudi Arabia kills 15 Egyptian pilgrims with 130 others injured.

Births

Pre-1600
120 – Vettius Valens, Greek astronomer, mathematician, and astrologer (probable; d. 175)
 412 – Proclus, Greek mathematician and philosopher (probable; d. 485)
 882 – Muhammad ibn Tughj al-Ikhshid, Egyptian commander and politician, Abbasid Governor of Egypt (d. 946)
1191 – Yaroslav II of Vladimir (d. 1246)
1291 – Afonso IV of Portugal (d. 1357)
1405 – Constantine XI Palaiologos, Byzantine emperor (d. 1453)
1487 – Ulrich, Duke of Württemberg (d. 1550)
1514 – Daniele Barbaro, Venetian churchman, diplomat and scholar (d. 1570)
1552 – Agrippa d'Aubigné, French poet and soldier (d. 1630)
1577 – Robert Burton, English priest, physician, and scholar (d. 1640)
1591 – Guercino, Italian painter (d. 1666)

1601–1900
1685 – Charles-Jean-François Hénault, French historian and author (d. 1770)
1700 – Daniel Bernoulli, Dutch-Swiss mathematician and physicist (d. 1782)
1720 – Emperor Sakuramachi of Japan (d. 1750)
1741 – André Grétry, Belgian-French organist and composer (d. 1813)
1762 – Gia Long, Vietnamese emperor (d. 1820)
1764 – Joseph Leopold Eybler, Austrian composer and conductor (d. 1846)
1792 – Caroline Augusta of Bavaria (d. 1873)
1798 – Grand Duke Michael Pavlovich of Russia (d. 1849)
1807 – Benjamin Waterhouse Hawkins, English sculptor and zoologist (d. 1889)
1817 – Richard S. Ewell, American general (d. 1872)
1819 – John Ruskin, English author, critic, and academic (d. 1900)
1820 – William Tecumseh Sherman, American general (d. 1891)
1822 – Maxime Du Camp, French photographer and journalist (d. 1894)
1825 – Henry Walter Bates, English geographer, biologist, and explorer (d. 1892)
1828 – Jules Verne, French author, poet, and playwright (d. 1905)
1829 – Vital-Justin Grandin, French-Canadian bishop and missionary (d. 1902)
1830 – Abdülaziz of the Ottoman Empire (d. 1876)
1834 – Dmitri Mendeleev, Russian chemist and academic (d. 1907)
1850 – Kate Chopin, American author (d. 1904)
1860 – Adella Brown Bailey, American politician and suffragist (d. 1937)
1866 – Moses Gomberg, Ukrainian-American chemist and academic (d. 1947)
1876 – Paula Modersohn-Becker, German painter (d. 1907)
1878 – Martin Buber, Austrian-Israeli philosopher and academic (d. 1965)
1880 – Franz Marc, German soldier and painter (d. 1916)
  1880   – Viktor Schwanneke, German actor and director (d. 1931)
1882 – Thomas Selfridge, American lieutenant and pilot (d. 1908)
1883 – Joseph Schumpeter, Czech-American economist and political scientist (d. 1950)
1884 – Snowy Baker, Australian boxer, rugby player, and actor (d. 1953)
1886 – Charlie Ruggles, American actor (d. 1970)
1888 – Edith Evans, English actress (d. 1976)
  1888   – Giuseppe Ungaretti, Egyptian-Italian soldier, journalist, and poet (d. 1970)
1890 – Claro M. Recto, Filipino lawyer, jurist, and politician (d. 1960)
1893 – Ba Maw, Burmese lawyer and politician, Prime Minister of Burma (d. 1977)
1894 – King Vidor, American director, producer, and screenwriter (d. 1982)
1897 – Zakir Hussain, Indian academic and politician, 3rd president of India (d. 1969)
1899 – Lonnie Johnson, American singer-songwriter and guitarist (d. 1970)

1901–present
1902 – Demchugdongrub, Mongol prince and politician, head of state of Mengjiang (d. 1966)
1903 – Greta Keller, Austrian-American singer and actress (d. 1977)
  1903   – Tunku Abdul Rahman, 1st Prime Minister of Malaysia (d. 1990)
1906 – Chester Carlson, American physicist and lawyer, invented Xerography (d. 1968)
1909 – Elisabeth Murdoch, Australian philanthropist (d. 2012)
1911 – Elizabeth Bishop, American poet and author (d. 1979)
1913 – Betty Field, American actress (d. 1973)
  1913   – Danai Stratigopoulou, Greek singer-songwriter (d. 2009)
1914 – Bill Finger, American author and screenwriter, co-created Batman (d. 1974)
1915 – Georges Guétary, Egyptian-French singer, dancer, and actor (d. 1997)
1918 – Freddie Blassie, American wrestler and manager (d. 2003)
1921 – Barney Danson, Canadian colonel and politician, 21st Canadian Minister of National Defence (d. 2011)
  1921   – Nexhmije Hoxha, Albanian politician (d. 2020)
  1921   – Balram Singh Rai, Guyanese politician, 1st Minister of Home Affairs  (d. 2022)  
  1921   – Lana Turner, American actress (d. 1995)
1922 – Audrey Meadows, American actress and banker (d. 1996)
1925 – Jack Lemmon, American actor (d. 2001)
1926 – Neal Cassady, American author and poet (d. 1968)
  1926   – Birgitte Reimer, Danish film actress (d. 2021)
1930 – Alejandro Rey, Argentinian-American actor and director (d. 1987)
1931 – James Dean, American actor (d. 1955)
1932 – Cliff Allison, English racing driver and businessman (d. 2005)
  1932   – John Williams, American pianist, composer, and conductor
1933 – Elly Ameling, Dutch soprano
1937 – Joe Raposo, American pianist and composer (d. 1989)
  1937   – Harry Wu, Chinese human rights activist (d. 2016)
1939 – Jose Maria Sison, Filipino activist and theorist (d. 2022)
1940 – Sophie Lihau-Kanza, Congolese politician (d. 1999)
  1940   – Ted Koppel, English-American journalist
1941 – Nick Nolte, American actor and producer
  1941   – Tom Rush, American singer-songwriter, guitarist, and producer
  1941   – Jagjit Singh, Indian singer-songwriter (d. 2011)
1942 – Robert Klein, American comedian, actor, and singer
  1942   – Terry Melcher, American singer-songwriter and producer (d. 2004)
1943 – Valerie Thomas, American scientist and inventor
1944 – Roger Lloyd-Pack, English actor (d. 2014)
  1944   – Sebastião Salgado, Brazilian photographer and journalist
1948 – Dan Seals, American singer-songwriter and guitarist (d. 2009)
1949 – Brooke Adams, American actress, producer, and screenwriter
  1949   – Niels Arestrup, French actor, director, and screenwriter
1952 – Marinho Chagas, Brazilian footballer and coach (d. 2014)
1953 – Mary Steenburgen, American actress
1955 – John Grisham, American lawyer and author
  1955   – Jim Neidhart, American wrestler (d. 2018)
1956 – Marques Johnson, American basketball player and sportscaster
1957 – Karine Chemla, French historian of mathematics and sinologist
1958 – Sherri Martel, American wrestler and manager (d. 2007)
  1958   – Marina Silva, Brazilian environmentalist and politician
1959 – Heinz Gunthardt, Swiss tennis player
  1959   – Andrew Hoy, Australian equestrian rider
  1959   – Mauricio Macri, Argentinian businessman and politician, President of Argentina
1960 – Benigno Aquino III, Filipino politician, 15th President of the Philippines (d. 2021)
  1960   – Dino Ciccarelli, Canadian ice hockey player
1961 – Vince Neil, American singer-songwriter and actor
1963 – Mohammad Azharuddin, Indian cricketer and politician
1964 – Arlie Petters, Belizean-American mathematical physicist and academic
  1964   – Santosh Sivan, Indian director, cinematographer, producer, and actor
  1964   – Trinny Woodall, English fashion designer and author
1966 – Kirk Muller, Canadian ice hockey player and coach
  1966   – Hristo Stoichkov, Bulgarian footballer and manager
1968 – Gary Coleman, American actor (d. 2010)
1969 – Pauly Fuemana, New Zealand-Australian singer-songwriter and guitarist (d. 2010)
  1969   – Mary Robinette Kowal, American puppeteer and author
  1969   – Mary McCormack, American actress and producer
1970 – Stephanie Courtney, American actress and comedian
  1970   – John Filan, Australian footballer and coach
  1970   – Alonzo Mourning, American basketball player and executive
1971 – Aidy Boothroyd, English footballer and manager
  1971   – Mika Karppinen, Swedish-Finnish drummer and songwriter
1972 – Big Show, American wrestler and actor
1974 – Seth Green, American actor, voice artist, comedian, producer, writer, and director
  1974   – Kimbo Slice, Bahamian-American mixed martial artist (d. 2016)
1976 – Khaled Mashud, Bangladeshi cricketer
  1976   – Nicolas Vouilloz, French rally driver and mountain biker
1977 – Roman Kostomarov, Russian ice dancer
1978 – Mick de Brenni, Australian politician
  1978   – Ranveer Brar,  Indian celebrity chef, Masterchef India judge, author and restaurateur
1979 – Aaron Cook, American baseball player
1980 – William Jackson Harper, American actor
1981 – Steve Gohouri, Ivorian footballer (d. 2015)
  1981   – Myriam Montemayor Cruz, Mexican singer
1983 – Jermaine Anderson, Canadian basketball player
  1983   – Cory Jane, New Zealand rugby player
1984 – Cecily Strong, American actress
  1984   – Panagiotis Vasilopoulos, Greek basketball player
1985 – Petra Cetkovská, Czech tennis player
  1985   – Jeremy Davis, American bass player and songwriter
  1985   – Brian Randle, American basketball player and coach
1986 – Anderson Paak, American singer, songwriter, rapper, record producer, and multi-instrumentalist
1987 – Javi García, Spanish footballer
  1987   – Carolina Kostner, Italian figure skater
1988 – Keegan Meth, Zimbabwean cricketer
1989 – Zac Guildford, New Zealand rugby player
  1989   – Julio Jones, American football player
1990 – Klay Thompson, American professional basketball player
1991 – Nam Woo-hyun, South Korean singer
1992 – Bruno Martins Indi, Portuguese-Dutch footballer
1994 – Hakan Çalhanoğlu, Turkish footballer
  1994   – Nikki Yanofsky, Canadian singer-songwriter
1995 – Joshua Kimmich, German footballer
1996 – Kenedy, Brazilian footballer

Deaths

Pre-1600
 538 – Severus of Antioch, patriarch of Antioch
1135 – Elvira of Castile, Queen of Sicily (b.c. 1100)
1204 – Alexios IV Angelos, Byzantine emperor (b. 1182)
1229 – Ali ibn Hanzala, sixth Dāʿī al-Muṭlaq of Tayyibi Isma'ilism
1250 – Robert I, Count of Artois (b. 1216)
  1250   – William II Longespée, English martyr (b. 1212)
1265 – Hulagu Khan, Mongol ruler (b. 1217)
1285 – Theodoric of Landsberg (b. 1242)
1296 – Przemysł II of Poland (b. 1257)
1314 – Helen of Anjou, queen of Serbia (b. 1236)
1382 – Blanche of France, Duchess of Orléans (b. 1328)
1537 – Saint Gerolamo Emiliani, Italian humanitarian (b. 1481)
1587 – Mary, Queen of Scots (b. 1542)
1599 – Robert Rollock, Scottish theologian and academic (b. 1555)

1601–1900
1623 – Thomas Cecil, 1st Earl of Exeter, English soldier and politician, Lord Lieutenant of Northamptonshire (b. 1546)
1676 – Alexis of Russia (b. 1629)
1696 – Ivan V of Russia (b. 1666)
1709 – Giuseppe Torelli, Italian violinist and composer (b. 1658)
1725 – Peter the Great, Russian emperor (b. 1672)
1749 – Jan van Huysum, Dutch painter (b. 1682)
1750 – Aaron Hill, English playwright and poet (b. 1685)
1768 – George Dance the Elder, English architect, designed St Leonard's and St Botolph's Aldgate (b. 1695)
1772 – Princess Augusta of Saxe-Gotha (b. 1719)
1849 – François Habeneck, French violinist and conductor (b. 1781)
  1849   – France Prešeren, Slovenian poet and lawyer (b. 1800)
1856 – Agostino Bassi, Italian entomologist and academic (b. 1773)

1901–present
1907 – Hendrik Willem Bakhuis Roozeboom, Dutch chemist and academic (b. 1854)
1910 – Hans Jæger, Norwegian philosopher and activist (b. 1854)
1914 – Dayrolles Eveleigh-de-Moleyns, 4th Baron Ventry, Irish hereditary peer (b. 1828)
1915 – François Langelier, Canadian journalist, lawyer, and politician, 10th Lieutenant Governor of Quebec (b. 1838)
1921 – George Formby Sr, English actor and singer (b. 1876)
  1921   – Peter Kropotkin, Russian zoologist, geographer, and philologist (b. 1842)
1928 – Theodor Curtius, German chemist (b. 1857)
1932 – Yordan Milanov, Bulgarian architect, designed the Sveti Sedmochislenitsi Church (b. 1867)
1935 – Eemil Nestor Setälä, Finnish linguist and politician, Finnish Minister for Foreign Affairs (b. 1864)
1936 – Charles Curtis, American lawyer and politician, 31st Vice President of the United States (b. 1860)
1945 – Italo Santelli, Italian fencer and coach (b. 1866)
1956 – Connie Mack, American baseball player and manager (b. 1862)
1957 – Walther Bothe, German physicist and academic, Nobel Prize laureate (b. 1891)
  1957   – John von Neumann, Hungarian-American mathematician and physicist (b. 1903)
1959 – William J. Donovan, American head of the Office of Strategic Services (OSS) (b. 1883)
1960 – J. L. Austin, English philosopher and academic (b. 1911)
  1960   – Giles Gilbert Scott, English architect and engineer, designed the Red telephone box and Liverpool Cathedral (b. 1880)
1963 – George Dolenz, Italian-American actor (b. 1908)
1964 – Ernst Kretschmer, German psychiatrist and author (b. 1888)
1971 – Kanaiyalal Munshi, Indian independence movement activist, politician, writer and educationist (b. 1887)
1972 – Markos Vamvakaris, Greek singer-songwriter and bouzouki player (b. 1905)
1975 – Robert Robinson, English chemist and academic, Nobel Prize laureate (b. 1886)
1977 – Eivind Groven, Norwegian composer and theorist (b. 1901)
1979 – Dennis Gabor, Hungarian-English physicist and engineer, Nobel Prize laureate (b. 1900)
1980 – Nikos Xilouris, Greek singer-songwriter (b. 1936)
1982 – John Hay Whitney, American financier and diplomat, United States Ambassador to the United Kingdom (b. 1904)
1985 – William Lyons, English businessman, co-founded Swallow Sidecar Company (b. 1901)
1987 – Harriet E. MacGibbon, American actress (b. 1905)
1990 – Del Shannon, American singer-songwriter and guitarist (b. 1934)
  1990   – Ernest Titterton, British Australian nuclear physicist (b. 1916)
1992 – Stanley Armour Dunham, American sergeant (b. 1918)
1994 – Raymond Scott, American pianist and composer (b. 1908)
1996 – Del Ennis, American baseball player (b. 1925)
1997 – Corey Scott, American motorcycle stunt rider (b. 1968)
1998 – Halldór Laxness, Icelandic author, poet, and playwright, Nobel Prize laureate (b. 1902)
  1998   – Enoch Powell, English soldier and politician, Secretary of State for Health (b. 1912)
  1998   – Julian Simon, American economist and author (b. 1932)
1999 – Iris Murdoch, Irish-born British novelist and philosopher (b. 1919)
2000 – Sid Abel, Canadian-American ice hockey player, coach, and sportscaster (b. 1918)
  2000   – Derrick Thomas, American football player (b. 1967)
2001 – Ivo Caprino, Norwegian director and screenwriter (b. 1920)
2002 – Ong Teng Cheong, Singaporean architect and politician, 5th President of Singapore (b. 1936)
2004 – Julius Schwartz, American journalist and author (b. 1915)
2005 – A. Chandranehru, Sri Lankan sailor and politician (b. 1944)
2006 – Elton Dean, English saxophonist, songwriter, and producer (b. 1945)
  2006   – Thierry Fortineau, French actor (b. 1953)
  2006   – Akira Ifukube, Japanese composer (b. 1914)
2007 – Anna Nicole Smith, American model and actress (b. 1967)
  2007   – Ian Stevenson, Canadian-American psychiatrist and academic (b. 1918)
2008 – Ruby Garrard Woodson, American educator and cultural historian (b. 1931)
2010 – John Murtha, American colonel and politician (b. 1932)
2011 – Tony Malinosky, American baseball player and soldier (b. 1909)
2012 – Wando, Brazilian singer-songwriter (b. 1945)
  2012   – Luis Alberto Spinetta, Argentinian singer-songwriter (b. 1950)
2013 – Giovanni Cheli, Italian cardinal (b. 1918)
  2013   – James DePreist, American conductor and educator (b. 1936)
  2013   – Maureen Dragone, American journalist and author (b. 1920)
  2013   – Nevin Scrimshaw, American scientist (b. 1918)
2014 – Els Borst, Dutch physician and politician, Deputy Prime Minister of the Netherlands (b. 1932)
  2014   – Maicon Pereira de Oliveira, Brazilian footballer (b. 1988)
  2014   – Nancy Holt, American sculptor and painter (b. 1938)
2015 – Rauni-Leena Luukanen-Kilde, Finnish physician and parapsychologist (b. 1939)
2016 – Amelia Bence, Argentine actress (b. 1914)
  2016   – Nida Fazli, Indian poet and songwriter (b. 1938)
  2016   – Margaret Forster, English historian, author, and critic (b. 1938)
  2016   – Violette Verdy, French ballerina (b. 1933)
2017 – Peter Mansfield, English physicist, Nobel laureate (b. 1933)
  2017   – Rina Matsuno, Japanese idol singer (b. 1998)
  2017   – Alan Simpson, English scriptwriter (b. 1929)
2020 – Robert Conrad, American actor (b. 1935) 
2021 – Marty Schottenheimer, American football player and coach (b. 1943)
  2021   – Mary Wilson, American singer (b. 1944)
2023 – Arto Heiskanen, Finnish professional hockey player (b. 1963)

Holidays and observances
Christian feast day:
Cuthmann of Steyning
Elffled of Whitby
Gerolamo Emiliani
Josephine Bakhita
Juventius of Pavia
Meingold of Huy
Stephen of Muret
February 8 (Eastern Orthodox liturgics)
Earliest day on which Feast of Orthodoxy can fall, while March 14 is the latest; celebrated 42 days before Easter; the first Sunday of Lent. (Orthodoxy)
Parinirvana Day (some Mahayana Buddhism traditions, most celebrate on February 15)
Prešeren Day (Slovenia)
Propose Day

References

External links

 BBC: On This Day
 
 Historical Events on February 8

Days of the year
February